Pazardalu (also Romanized as Pāzardālū; also known as Monirabad (Persian: مُنير آباد), also Romanized as Monīrābād) is a village in Silakhor-e Sharqi Rural District, in the Central District of Azna County, Lorestan Province, Iran. At the 2006 census, its population was 319, in 68 families.

References 

Towns and villages in Azna County